Araiophos is an oceanic  ray-finned fish genus which belongs in the family Sternoptychidae.

Species
There are currently two recognized species in this genus:
 Araiophos eastropas Ahlstrom & Moser, 1969
 Araiophos gracilis Grey, 1961

References

Sternoptychidae
Marine fish genera
Ray-finned fish genera